The 2008–09 Washington State Cougars men's basketball team represented Washington State University for the 2008–09 NCAA Division I men's basketball season. The team played its home games on Jack Friel Court in Beasley Coliseum in Pullman, Washington.

At the end of March 2009, Tony Bennett announced that he was leaving Washington State to take the head coaching job at Virginia. Ken Bone, formerly with Portland State, took over.

Roster

Schedule

|-
!colspan=9| Exhibition

|-
!colspan=9| Regular Season

|-
!colspan=9| Pac-10 tournament

|-
!colspan=9| National Invitation Tournament

Notes
 Taylor Rochestie was named to the All-Pac-10 team; DeAngelo Casto and Klay Thompson were named to the All-Freshman team.

References

Washington State Cougars men's basketball seasons
Washington State
Washington State
Washington State
Washington State